The 2022 East Tennessee State Buccaneers football team represented East Tennessee State University  as a member of the Southern Conference (SoCon) during the 2022 NCAA Division I FCS football season. The Buccaneers were led by first-year head coach George Quarles and play their home games at William B. Greene Jr. Stadium in Johnson City, Tennessee.

Previous season

The Buccaneers finished the 2021 season 11–2, 7–1 in SoCon play to win the Southern Conference championship, they received an automatic bid to FCS Playoffs where they received a first round bye, where they beat Kennesaw State in the second round, before losing to national champion North Dakota State in the quarterfinals. On December 13, 2021, head coach Randy Sanders announce his retirement. He finish with a 4-year, 33rd overall with a record of 26–16.  Former Furman associate head coach George Quarles will be the next head coach for the Buccaneers.

Schedule

Game summaries

Mars Hill

at The Citadel

Furman

at Robert Morris

No. 12 Chattanooga

at VMI

at No. 12 Mercer

No. 15 Samford

at Wofford

Western Carolina

at Mississippi State

References

East Tennessee State
East Tennessee State Buccaneers football seasons
East Tennessee State Buccaneers football